The 2009–10 Scottish Second Division will be the fifteenth season of the Second Division in its current format of ten teams.

Promotion and relegation from 2008–09

First & Second Divisions
Relegated from First Division to Second Division
 Clyde

Promoted from Second Division to First Division
 Raith Rovers
 Ayr United

Second & Third Divisions
Relegated from Second Division to Third Division
 Queen's Park
 Stranraer

Promoted from Third Division to Second Division
 Dumbarton
 Stenhousemuir
 Cowdenbeath

League table

Results
Each team plays every other team four times during the season, twice at home and twice away, for a total of 36 matches.

First half of season

Second half of the season

Second Division play-offs
Times are BST (UTC+1)

Semi-finals
The ninth placed team in the Second Division played the fourth placed team in the Third Division and third placed team in the Third Division played the second placed team in the Third Division. The play-offs were played over two legs, the winning team in each semi-final advanced to the final.

First legs

Second legs

Final
The two semi-final winners played each other over two legs. The winning team was awarded a place in the 2010–11 Second Division.

First leg

Second leg

References

Scottish Second Division seasons
2009–10 Scottish Football League
3
Scot